Yang Hong (born 8 September 1971) is a Chinese rower. She competed in the women's quadruple sculls event at the 1992 Summer Olympics.

References

1971 births
Living people
Chinese female rowers
Olympic rowers of China
Rowers at the 1992 Summer Olympics
Place of birth missing (living people)